Archbishop Fulgence Rabemahafaly (born 23 May 1951 in Miarinavaratra) is the Archbishop of the Archdiocese of Fianarantsoa in Fianarantsoa, Madagascar. He was ordained as a priest on 14 August 1980 in Fianarantsoa. He was previously the Bishop of the Diocese of Ambositra from June 1999 until his appointment to his current archbishopric on 1 October 2002.

External links
 Catholic Hierarchy

1951 births
Living people
People from Amoron'i Mania
Fianarantsoa
20th-century Roman Catholic bishops in Madagascar
21st-century Roman Catholic archbishops in Madagascar
Malagasy Roman Catholic archbishops
Malagasy Roman Catholic bishops
Roman Catholic archbishops of Fianarantsoa
Roman Catholic bishops of Ambositra